The Municipality of Harrison Park is a rural municipality (RM) in the Canadian province of Manitoba that incorporated on January 1, 2015 via the amalgamation of the RMs of Harrison and Park. It was formed as a requirement of The Municipal Amalgamations Act, which required that municipalities with a population less than 1,000 amalgamate with one or more neighbouring municipalities by 2015. The Government of Manitoba initiated these amalgamations in order for municipalities to meet the 1997 minimum population requirement of 1,000 to incorporate a municipality.

Harrison Park is located south of Riding Mountain National Park.

Demographics 

References

External links 
 

2015 establishments in Manitoba
Manitoba municipal amalgamations, 2015
Populated places established in 2015
Rural municipalities in Manitoba